British Museum was a station on the London Underground, located in Holborn, central London. It was latterly served by the Central line and took its name from the nearby British Museum in Great Russell Street.

The station was opened by the Central London Railway in 1900. In 1933, with the expansion of Holborn station, less than 100 yards away, British Museum station was permanently closed. It was subsequently utilised as a military office and command post, but in 1989 the surface building was demolished. A portion of the eastbound tunnel is used to store materials for track maintenance, visible from passing trains.

History
British Museum station was opened on 30 July 1900 by the Central London Railway (CLR; now the Central line), with its entrance located at No. 133, High Holborn (now Hogarth House, a co-working/workspace venue), near the junction with New Oxford Street. In December 1906, Holborn station was opened by the Great Northern, Piccadilly and Brompton Railway (GNP&BR; now the Piccadilly line) less than 100 yards away. Despite being built and operated by separate companies, it was common for the underground railways to plan routes and locate stations so that interchanges could be easily formed between services. This had been done by other lines connecting with the CLR stations at Oxford Circus and Tottenham Court Road, but an interchange station was not initially constructed between the GNP&BR and the CLR because the tunnel alignment to British Museum station would not have been suitable for the GNP&BR's route to its Strand station (later renamed Aldwych). The junction between High Holborn and the newly constructed Kingsway was also a more prominent location for a station than that chosen by the CLR.

The possibility of an underground passageway was initially mooted, but the idea suffered from the complexity of tunneling between the stations. Holborn station was, in any case, better situated than British Museum, as it had better tram connections (Holborn had a stop on the now defunct Kingsway tramway subway). A proposal to enlarge the tunnels under High Holborn to create new platforms at Holborn station for the CLR and to abandon the British Museum station was originally included in a private bill submitted to parliament by the CLR in November 1913, although the First World War prevented any work taking place. The works were eventually carried out as part of the modernisation of Holborn station at the beginning of the 1930s when escalators were installed in place of lifts. British Museum station was closed on 24 September 1933, with the new platforms at Holborn opening the following day.

British Museum station was subsequently used up to the 1960s as a military administrative office and emergency command post, but the surface station building was demolished in 1989, and the platforms could no longer be accessed from street level. The platforms have since been removed, thus lowering the entire tunnel floor to track level. A portion of the eastbound tunnel is used by engineers to store materials for track maintenance, which can be seen from passing trains.

In popular culture

 In the Neil Gaiman novel Neverwhere the main character, Richard Mayhew, a Londoner, protests that there is no British Museum station, only to be proved wrong when his train stops there.
 The station was mentioned in the 1972 horror film Death Line, but contrary to popular belief, it is not the station portrayed in the film as being the home of a community of cannibals descended from Victorian railway workers. The cannibals venture out at night to snatch travellers from the platforms of operating stations and take them back to their gruesome 'pantry' at an incomplete station.  Donald Pleasence stars as the investigating police inspector, and when finally cornered, one of the cannibals screams a corrupted form of "Mind the doors!", obviously having picked it up parrot-fashion from the guards on the Underground trains. The station in question is named simply 'Museum' and is clearly stated as being 'between' Holborn and British Museum stations in a conversation between Pleasence's character and a colleague. It is supposedly part of a completely separate line that was not completed owing to the construction company going bankrupt. Signs in the abandoned station also only state 'Museum' as the name.
 The station was featured in the Bulldog Drummond spin-off film Bulldog Jack as the location reached by a secret tunnel leading from the inside of a sarcophagus in the British Museum. The villain Morelle (Ralph Richardson) is finally cornered and forced into a sword duel on the disused platforms, which were a studio set. The station was renamed 'Bloomsbury' in the film.
 The station briefly featured in the computer game Broken Sword: The Smoking Mirror, in which Nico Collard escapes from the British Museum and finds the station. She then manages to stop the passing trains. The station in the game, however, is depicted as having its exit actually inside the British Museum itself.  A station named 'Museum' also features in the earlier game Beneath a Steel Sky, by the same company, but the apparent Australian setting for the latter game, as well as its proximity to a station named 'St. James' suggests this is actually the Museum railway station in Sydney.
 The station is reputed to be haunted by the ghost of the daughter of an Egyptian Pharaoh called Amen-ra which would appear and scream so loudly that the noise would carry down the tunnels to adjoining stations.

See also
List of former and unopened London Underground stations

References

External links

 London's Abandoned Tube Stations - British Museum
 Underground History: Deep Level Lines
 Photographs showing the construction of the British Museum underground station at the British Library
 London Transport Museum Photographic Archive
 
 
 

Central line (London Underground) stations
Disused London Underground stations
Disused railway stations in the London Borough of Camden
Former Central London Railway stations
Railway stations in Great Britain opened in 1900
Railway stations in Great Britain closed in 1933
Tube station
Buildings and structures in Bloomsbury
Railway stations located underground in the United Kingdom